Herbert Lawrence Block, commonly known as Herblock (October13, 1909October7, 2001), was an American editorial cartoonist and author best known for his commentaries on national domestic and foreign policy.

During the course of a career stretching into nine decades, he won three Pulitzer Prizes for editorial cartooning (1942, 1954, and 1979), shared a fourth Pulitzer Prize in 1973 for Public Service on Watergate, the Presidential Medal of Freedom (1994), the National Cartoonist Society Editorial Cartoon Award in 1957 and 1960, the Reuben Award in 1956, the Gold Key Award (the National Cartoonists Society Hall of Fame) in 1979, and numerous other honors.

Career
Block was the youngest of three boys born in Chicago to a Catholic mother, Theresa Lupe Block, and a father of Jewish descent, David Julian Block, a chemist and electrical engineer. His brother Rich became president of an industrial laundry and his brother Bill was a newspaper reporter for the Chicago Tribune and later for the Chicago Sun.

He began taking classes at the Art Institute of Chicago when he was eleven, and adopted the "Herblock" signature in high school.

After graduating in 1927, he attended Lake Forest College for almost two years.

Late in his second year there he was hiredafter submitting some cartoons he had done in high school and college for the Evanston News-Indexto replace the Chicago Daily News departing editorial cartoonist. He never returned to school.

Block moved to Cleveland in 1933 to become the staff cartoonist for Newspaper Enterprise Association, which distributed his cartoons nationally.

He won his first Pulitzer Prize in 1942, then spent two years in the Army doing cartoons and press releases.
Upon discharge Block became chief editorial cartoonist for The Washington Post, where he worked until his death 55 years later.

Block's cartoons were syndicated to newspapers around the world by Creators Syndicate from 1987 until his death in 2001.

He never married, and, in the Post'''s employee index, his address was listed as simply "The Washington Post".

Cartoons
His first cartoon for the Chicago Daily News (April24, 1929)
advocated conservation of America's forests.
Herblock said that his family was conservative and that his father voted for Herbert Hoover in 1928.
But with the onset of the Great Depression, he became a supporter of President Franklin D. Roosevelt and the New Deal.
He pointed out the dangers of Soviet aggression, the growing Nazi menace, and opposed American isolationists.

While he criticized Stalin and other Communist figures, he also believed that the United States was overreacting to the danger of communism.

In the early 1950s, Senator Joseph McCarthy was a recurring target of Herblock's cartoons, one of which introduced the term McCarthyism.
He won a second Pulitzer Prize in 1954.The Washington Post officially endorsed Eisenhower in the 1952 presidential election.
Because Herblock supported Adlai Stevenson, the Post pulled his cartoons, but restored them after a week.
He always insisted on total editorial independence, regardless of whether or not his cartoons agreed with the Post's stance on political issues.
He focused most of his attacks on those public figures in power, often on Republican figures, but Democrats who displeased him were not immune from criticism.
As an example—despite being an ardent admirer of Franklin Roosevelt—he found it necessary to attack the president's 1937 court-packing scheme.

During the 1950s, Herblock criticized Eisenhower mainly for insufficient action on civil rights and for not curbing the abuses of Senator McCarthy.
In the following decade, he attacked the US war effort in Vietnam, causing President Johnson to drop his plans of awarding the cartoonist with a Presidential Medal of Freedom.
The cartoonist would eventually be awarded this honor by Bill Clinton in 1994.

Some of Herblock's finest cartoons were those attacking the Nixon Administration during the Watergate Scandal, winning him his third Pulitzer Prize in 1979.
Nixon canceled his subscription to the Post after Herblock drew him crawling out of an open sewer in 1954.
He had once used the same motif for Senator McCarthy.

He also ended up on the president's infamous enemies list.
In the 1980s and 1990s, he satirized and criticized Presidents Reagan, George H.W. Bush, and Clinton in addition to taking on the issues of the day: Gun control; abortion; the influence of fundamentalist Christian groups on public policy; and the Dot Com bubble.
The tobacco industry was a favorite target of Herblock, who had smoked at one time.
He gave it up and had criticized cigarette companies even before that.

Stating that he never got tired of his work, Herblock continued as the 21st century began by lampooning newly elected president George W. Bush.
He died on October7, 2001, after a protracted bout of pneumonia six days short of what would have been his 92nd birthday.
His final cartoon appeared in The Washington Post on August26.

Honors
Herblock won three Pulitzer Prizes for editorial cartooning (1942, 1954, 1979), shared a fourth Pulitzer Prize in 1973 for Public Service on Watergate, the Presidential Medal of Freedom (1994), the National Cartoonist Society Editorial Cartoon Award in 1957 and 1960, the Reuben Award in 1956, and the Gold Key Award (the National Cartoonists Society Hall of Fame) in 1979.
In 1986 he received the Elijah Parish Lovejoy Award as well as an honorary Doctor of Laws degree from Colby College, and in 1999 an honorary Doctor of Arts degree from Harvard University.

In 1961, he was chosen as one of 50 outstanding Americans of meritorious performance in the fields of endeavor, to be honored as a Guest of Honor to the first annual Banquet of the Golden Plate in Monterey, California. Honor was awarded by vote of the National Panel of Distinguished Americans of the Academy of Achievement.

In 1966, he was selected to design the U.S. postage stamp commemorating the 175th anniversary of the Bill of Rights.

In 1987 he received the Four Freedoms Award for the Freedom of Speech.

In 2008 Herblock's work was the subject of exhibitions entitled Herblock's Presidents at the Smithsonian Institution's National Portrait Gallery (United States), and Herblock's History at the Library of Congress.
In late 2009 and early 2010, the Library of Congress showcased a new exhibition called Herblock!.
This exhibition included cartoons that represented Block's ability to wield his pen effectively and artfully.
He used it to condemn corruption and expose injustice, inequality, and immorality.
His topics included the Great Depression; the rise of fascism and World War II; communism and the Cold War; Senator Joseph McCarthy; race relations; Richard Nixon; the Reagan era; the 2000 election and more.

When Herb Block died in October 2001, he left $50 million with instructions to create a foundation to support charitable and educational programs that help promote and sustain the causes he championed during his 72 years of cartooning.
The Herb Block Foundation awarded its first grants and the annual Herblock Prize in editorial cartooning in 2004.
According to its website, the Herb Block Foundation "is committed to defending the basic freedoms guaranteed all Americans, combating all forms of discrimination and prejudice and improving the conditions of the poor and underprivileged through the creation or support of charitable and educational programs with the same goals. The Foundation is also committed to improving educational opportunities to deserving students through post-secondary education scholarships and to promoting editorial cartooning through continuing research."

On January 27, 2014, HBO premiered a documentary, Herblock: The Black & The White, which was executive produced by George Stevens Jr., produced and directed by his son, Michael Stevens, who also co-wrote with Sara Lukinson. The documentary interviews Jon Stewart, Lewis Black, Tom Brokaw, Bob Woodward, Carl Bernstein, Jules Feiffer, Ted Koppel and Ben Bradlee as witnesses to Block's life, work and indelible contribution to American satire.

Books of collected cartoons by Herbert Block 

Block, Herbert. Herblock: The Life and Works of the Great Political Cartoonist ed. by Harry Katz (W. W. Norton, 2009), 304pp; prints more than two hundred fifty cartoons in the text; comes with a DVD containing more than 18,000 Herblock cartoonsHerblock's history: political cartoons from the crash to the millennium. Library of Congress, 2000.Herblock: a cartoonist's life. Maxwell Macmillan International, 1993.Herblock at large: "Let's go back a little ..." and other cartoons with commentary Pantheon Books, 1987.Herblock through the looking glass Norton, 1984.Herblock on all fronts: text and cartoons New American Library, 1980Herblock special report Norton, 1974Herblock's state of the Union. Simon & Schuster, (1972)The Herblock gallery. Simon & Schuster, (1968)Straight Herblock.  Simon & Schuster (1964)Herblock's special for today. Simon & Schuster, (1958).Herblock's here and now. Simon & Schuster, (1955).The Herblock book (1952)Herblock looks at Communism [1950?]

References

Further reading
 Appleford, Simon, "Drawing Liberalism: Herblock's Political Cartoons in Postwar America" (2023)
 Appleford, Simon. "Revealing Political Bias: A Macroanalysis of 8,480 Herblock Cartoons." Current Research in Digital History 1 (2018). online

 Harvey, Robert C. "Herblock" in American National Biography Online April 2004 Update online
 Heitzmann, William Ray. "The political cartoon as a teaching device." Teaching Political Science 6.2 (1979): 166-184. https://doi.org/10.1080/00922013.1979.11000158

Johnson, Haynes, and Harry Katz, "Herblock: The Life And Work Of The Great Political Cartoonist" (2009)
 Lamb, Chris. "Herblock's History" Journal of American History 100#3  (2013) Pp. 946–947, online
 McCarthy, Michael P. "Political Cartoons in the History Classroom." History Teacher 11.1 (1977): 29-38. online

 Medhurst, Martin J., and Michael A. DeSousa. "Political cartoons as rhetorical form: A taxonomy of graphic discourse." Communications Monographs 48.3 (1981): 197-236.

External links

Many of Herblock's works can be found at the Library of Congress.
Herblock's History (online exhibition from the Library of Congress)

The Herb Block Foundation
Herblock obituary, The New York Times''
Billy Ireland Cartoon Library & Museum Art Database

1909 births
2001 deaths
American editorial cartoonists
American caricaturists
Jewish caricaturists
Lake Forest College alumni
Presidential Medal of Freedom recipients
Pulitzer Prize for Editorial Cartooning winners
Reuben Award winners
School of the Art Institute of Chicago alumni
The Washington Post people
Recipients of the Four Freedoms Award